The Hollywood Supporting Actress Award is a category of the Hollywood Film Festival held annually, with the exception of 2004, since 2003.

Winners
 "†" indicates an Academy Award-winning performance
 "‡" indicates an Academy Award-nominated performance

External links
 

Awards established in 2003
Film awards for supporting actress
Supporting Actress Award